Desperate Moment is a 1953 British thriller film directed by Compton Bennett and starring Dirk Bogarde, Mai Zetterling and Philip Friend. It is based on the 1951 novel of the same title by Martha Albrand.

It was made at Pinewood Studios and on location in Germany including scenes shot at Berlin's Brandenburg Gate. The film's sets were designed by the art director Maurice Carter.

Plot
In the years immediately after World War II, a Dutchman, ex resistance, is sentenced to life imprisonment for a murder, committed during a robbery, that he confessed to but did not commit. After discovering that the girl he has loved since childhood is not dead, as he had been told, he escapes from prison and goes on the run through a devastated Germany in search of the witnesses who can clear him, with her help. But the witnesses begin to die apparently accidental deaths shortly before he finds them...

Cast
 Dirk Bogarde as Simon Van Halder 
 Mai Zetterling as Anna DeBurg 
 Philip Friend as Captain Bob Sawyer 
 Albert Lieven as Paul Ravitch
 Fritz Wendhausen as Warder Goeter 
 Carl Jaffe as Becker 
 Gerard Heinz as German Prison Doctor
 André Mikhelson as Polizei Inspector 
 Harold Ayer as Captain Trevor Wood
 Walter Gotell as Ravitch's Servant-Henchman 
 Friedrich Joloff as Valentin Vladek
 Simone Silva as Mink, Valentin's girl 
 Ferdy Mayne as Detective Laurence 
 Walter Rilla as Colonel Bertrand, Dutch consulate 
 Antonio Gallardo as Spanish Dancer
 Paul Hardtmuth as Wharf Watchman
 Theodore Bikel as Anton Meyer

Critical reception
The New York Times wrote, "the sum and substance of this production...is a great deal of panting exercise within and all over two cities, offering little about which to care" whereas TV Guide found it "quite suspenseful, with Bogarde turning in an exceptionally fine performance."

References

External links

1953 films
British thriller films
Films directed by Compton Bennett
1950s thriller films
Films set in Germany
Films shot at Pinewood Studios
Films shot in Berlin
Films set in Berlin
Films set in Munich
Films set in Hamburg
Films set in the 1940s
British black-and-white films
Films with screenplays by Patrick Kirwan
Films based on German novels
1950s English-language films
1950s British films